Ferdinand Alexander "Sandro" Araneta Marcos III (born March 7, 1994) is a Filipino politician who is the representative of Ilocos Norte's 1st congressional district since 2022, and the eldest of three sons of Philippine President  Bongbong Marcos and First Lady Liza Araneta Marcos.

Early life and education 
Marcos, nicknamed "Sandro", was born Ferdinand Alexander Araneta Marcos III on March 7, 1994, in Laoag, Ilocos Norte to Bongbong Marcos, then-Representative of the 2nd district of Ilocos Norte, and attorney Liza Araneta Marcos. He is the eldest of the three sons. He is the grandson of the late president, Ferdinand Marcos Sr. and his wife Imelda Marcos.

Marcos attended Don Sergio Osmeña Senior Memorial National High School, Inc. and Padre Annibale School in Laoag for his primary education. He then left for the United Kingdom and attended the Worth School for his secondary education from 2006 to 2013. After that, he went to the University of London, where he earned a degree in Bachelor of Science in International Relations in 2016. He then earned his master's degree in developmental studies at the London School of Economics and Political Science in 2017.

Political career
Prior to running for public office, Marcos worked as a member of the legislative staff of House Majority Leader and Leyte 1st District Rep. Martin Romualdez, his father's cousin, whom he sees as his mentor.

House of Representatives (2022–present)

Marcos ran for representative of Ilocos Norte's 1st district in 2022 and won, defeating incumbent Ria Christina Fariñas. Despite being a neophyte congressman, he was elected House Senior Deputy Majority Leader in the 19th Congress of the Philippines on July 26, 2022.

On late November 2022, Marcos, together with his uncle, House Speaker Martin Romualdez, filed House Bill No. 6398, also known as the controversial Maharlika Investment Fund. The aim is to create a sovereign wealth fund for the Philippines, drawing inspiration from South Korea's own sovereign wealth fund. MIF was approved by the House of Representatives on December 12, 2022. Economist Michael Batu said the bill can help raise money to help the government's programs and achieve development goals, if managed properly.

References

External links

1994 births
Living people
Children of presidents of the Philippines
Marcos family
21st-century Filipino politicians
Politicians from Ilocos Norte
Ilocano people
Filipino people of Basque descent
Members of the House of Representatives of the Philippines from Ilocos Norte
Nacionalista Party politicians
People educated at Worth School
Alumni of the University of London
Alumni of the London School of Economics